is a Japanese footballer currently playing as a midfielder for Tiamo Hirakata from 2023.

Career

Youth career
Until 2016, he begin youth career with Cerezo Osaka.

In 2017, he moved to Kindai University until 2020 officially graduated.

Senior career
In 2021, Tsuboi begin first professional career and joined to J3 club, Vanraure Hachinohe.

In 2022, Tsuboi joined to JFL club, Tiamo Hirakata for upcoming 2023 season.

Career statistics

Club
.

Notes

References

1998 births
Living people
Association football people from Osaka Prefecture
Kindai University alumni
Japanese footballers
Association football midfielders
J3 League players
Japan Football League players
Cerezo Osaka players
Vanraure Hachinohe players
FC Tiamo Hirakata players